The Quarrymen (also written as "the Quarry Men") are a British skiffle/rock and roll group, formed by John Lennon in Liverpool in 1956, which evolved into the Beatles in 1960. Originally consisting of Lennon and several schoolfriends, the Quarrymen took their name from a line in the school song of their school, the Quarry Bank High School. Lennon's mother, Julia, taught her son to play the banjo, showed Lennon and Eric Griffiths how to tune their guitars in a similar way to the banjo, and taught them simple chords and songs.

Lennon founded a skiffle group that was briefly called the Blackjacks, but they changed the name before any public performances. Some accounts credit Lennon with choosing the new name; other accounts credit his close friend Pete Shotton with suggesting the name. The Quarrymen played at parties, school dances, cinemas and amateur skiffle contests before Paul McCartney joined in October 1957. George Harrison joined in early 1958 at McCartney's recommendation, though Lennon initially resisted because he felt Harrison (14 when he was introduced to Lennon) was too young. McCartney and Harrison attended the Liverpool Institute.

The group made an amateur recording in 1958, performing Buddy Holly's "That'll Be the Day" and "In Spite of All the Danger", a song written by McCartney and Harrison. The group moved towards rock and roll, causing several of the original members to leave. This left Lennon, McCartney, and Harrison, who performed under several other names, including Johnny and the Moondogs and Japage 3 before returning to the Quarrymen name in 1959. In 1960, the group changed their name to "The Beatles" (chosen for its double meaning). The name was conceived of late at night by Lennon and Stuart Sutcliffe, by then the group's fourth member, and introduced to the other two the next day. They were initially booked as "The Silver Beetles" by local clubs who saw it as a more sellable name than "The Beatles" and went on to be the best-selling music act of all time.

In 1997, the four surviving original members of the Quarrymen reunited to perform at the 40th anniversary celebrations of the garden fête performance at which Lennon and McCartney met for the first time. Since 1998, they have performed in countries outside the UK and released four albums. Three original members still perform as the Quarrymen.

History

Formation and early performances

In the mid-1950s, there was a revival in the United Kingdom of the musical form "skiffle" that had originated in the United States and had been popular in the US in the 1920s, '30s and '40s. In addition to its popularity among British teenagers as music to listen to, it also spawned a craze of teenage boys starting their own groups to perform the music. One of the primary attractions was that it did not require great musical skills or expensive instruments to be played. Early British skiffle was played by traditional jazz musicians, with the most successful British proponent of the genre in the 1950s being Lonnie Donegan. The Quarrymen's initial repertoire included several songs that Donegan had recorded. When Lennon wanted to try making music himself, he and fellow Quarry Bank school friend, Griffiths, took guitar lessons in Hunt's Cross, Liverpool, although Lennon gave up the lessons soon after, as they were based on theory and not actual playing.

As Griffiths already knew how to play the banjo, Lennon's mother showed them how to tune the top four strings of their guitars to the same notes as a banjo, and taught them the chords of D, C, and D7, as well as the Fats Domino song, "Ain't That a Shame". They practised at Lennon's aunt's house (called Mendips) at 251 Menlove Avenue where Lennon lived, or at Griffiths' house in Halewood Drive. They learned how to play "Rock Island Line", "Jump Down Turn Around (Pick a Bale of Cotton)", "Alabamy Bound" and "Cumberland Gap", and later learned how to play "That's All Right" and "Mean Woman Blues".

Lennon and Griffiths decided to form a skiffle group in November 1956. This initial line-up consisted of Lennon and Griffiths on guitars, Pete Shotton on washboard, and school friend Bill Smith on tea chest bass. The group, initially called the Blackjacks, quickly changed their name to the Quarrymen. Both Lennon and Shotton have been credited with coining the name Quarrymen after a line in their school's song: 'Quarrymen, old before our birth. Straining each muscle and sinew.' The choice of name was tongue-in-cheek as Lennon regarded the reference in the school song to "straining each muscle and sinew" as risible. Smith's tenure in the band was extremely short, and he was replaced in quick succession by Nigel Walley, Ivan Vaughan, and Len Garry throughout late 1956 and early 1957. Also during this period, drummer Colin Hanton and banjo player Rod Davis joined the group. This group of Lennon, Griffiths, Shotton, Garry, Hanton, and Davis formed the first stable line-up of the group.

The group first rehearsed in Shotton's house on Vale Road, but because of the noise, his mother told them to use the corrugated air-raid shelter in the back garden. Rehearsals were moved from the cold air-raid shelter to Hanton's or Griffiths' house — as Griffiths' father had died in WWII, and his mother worked all day. The band also often visited Lennon's mother at 1 Blomfield Road, listening to her collection of rock and roll records by Elvis, Shirley and Lee's "Let the Good Times Roll", and Gene Vincent's "Be-Bop-A-Lula" which they added to their repertoire. After his tenure on tea-chest bass, Walley became the group's manager. He sent flyers to local theatres and ballrooms, and put up posters designed by Lennon: "Country-and-western, rock n' roll, skiffle band — The Quarrymen — Open for Engagements — Please Call Nigel Walley, Tel. Gateacre 1715".
Walley managed to secure the group several paid engagements throughout the spring of 1957, including one at The Cavern Club. A jazz club at the time, the Cavern tolerated skiffle as it was considered an offshoot of jazz. Lennon, however, began leading the band in several rock and roll numbers, prompting the club's manager to send up a note ordering the group to "cut out the bloody rock".

In July 1957, Canadian impresario Carroll Levis held a talent contest in Liverpool, the winners of which would appear on the television series Star Search. The Quarrymen played "Worried Man Blues", and were loudly applauded, but a group from Wales (called the Sunnyside Skiffle Group) "jumped all over the stage" and outshone the static Quarrymen, and were asked by Levis to fill in the last few minutes of the contest with a second song. Lennon argued heatedly with Levis backstage, saying the Sunnyside Skiffle Group had brought a bus full of supporters with them, and were given "the upper hand" advantage by Levis. After the competition, Levis used a clap-o-meter (a machine to measure the decibels of the audience's reaction to the groups) as they were asked to walk back out onto the stage. The Quarrymen and the Sunnyside Skiffle Group tied by both reaching ninety on the meter, but after a second test, the Quarrymen lost by a small margin.

Paul McCartney joins the group

On 6 July 1957, The Quarrymen played at the St. Peter's Church Rose Queen garden fête in Woolton. They first played on the back of a moving flatbed lorry, in a procession of floats that carried the Rose Queen and retiring Rose Queen, Morris dancers, Boy Scouts, Brownies, Girl Guides and Cubs, led by the Band of the Cheshire Yeomanry. At 4:15, they played on a permanent stage in the field behind the church, before a display by the City of Liverpool Police Dogs. They were playing "Come Go with Me" when Paul McCartney arrived, and in the Scout hut after the set, Ivan Vaughan introduced McCartney to Lennon, who chatted for a few minutes before the band set up in the church hall for their performance at that evening's "Grand Dance". McCartney demonstrated how he tuned his guitar and then sang Eddie Cochran's "Twenty Flight Rock", Gene Vincent's "Be-Bop-a-Lula", and a medley of Little Richard songs.

Vaughan and McCartney left before the evening show which started at 8 o'clock. During the performance, there was an unexpected thunderstorm, which made the lights go out. Bob Molyneux, a young schoolmate from Quarry Bank, recorded part of the performance on his Grundig TK8 portable reel-to-reel tape recorder. The tape included versions of Lonnie Donegan's "Puttin' on the Style" and Elvis' "Baby Let's Play House". In 1963, Molyneux offered the tape to Lennon via Ringo Starr, but Lennon never responded, so Molyneux put the tape in a vault.

As they were walking home after the evening performance, Lennon and Shotton discussed the afternoon encounter with McCartney, and Lennon said that perhaps they should invite McCartney to join the band. Two weeks later, Shotton encountered McCartney cycling through Woolton, and conveyed Lennon's casual invitation for him to join the Quarrymen, and Vaughan also invited McCartney to join. McCartney said he would join after Scout camp in Hathersage, Derbyshire, and a holiday with his family at the Butlin's holiday camp in Filey, North Yorkshire. Shotton and Davis both left the Quarrymen in August, feeling that the group was moving away from skiffle and towards rock, leaving their instruments superfluous. When McCartney returned from holiday, he began rehearsing with the Quarrymen, playing songs such as "Bye Bye Love" (The Everly Brothers) and "All Shook Up", which Lennon and the group had been trying to learn, without success.

McCartney made his debut with the band on 18 October 1957 at a Conservative Club social held at the New Clubmoor Hall in the Norris Green section of Liverpool. Lennon and McCartney wore cream-coloured sports jackets, which were paid for by the whole group—Walley collected half a crown per week from each member until they were paid for — and the others wore white shirts with tassels and black bootlace ties. To the irritation of the other group members, McCartney endlessly practised the lead guitar intro to "Raunchy".
The Quarrymen continued to play sparse gigs throughout the autumn of 1957, mostly for local promoter Charlie McBain. During this period, the group almost entirely excised skiffle from their repertoire, focusing on covers of songs by rock and roll singers such as Elvis Presley, Carl Perkins, Little Richard, and Larry Williams, and the Quarrymen's sound increasingly relied on harmony singing between Lennon and McCartney. An extremely important influence for them at the time was Buddy Holly and his group the Crickets. Around this time, Lennon and McCartney both started writing songs influenced by Holly – Lennon's "Hello Little Girl" and McCartney's "I Lost My Little Girl" – and both were impressed with each other's efforts. The two young men began writing together.

George Harrison's entry and recording

After McCartney's poor performance on lead guitar at the Conservative Club, the group needed another guitarist to accommodate their new rock-focused repertoire; McCartney recommended his school friend George Harrison. Harrison first saw the group perform on 6 February 1958 at Wilson Hall, where McCartney introduced him to Lennon. Harrison subsequently auditioned for The Quarrymen in March at Rory Storm's Morgue Skiffle Club, playing "Guitar Boogie Shuffle". Lennon thought Harrison (having just turned 15) was too young to join the band, so McCartney engineered another meeting on the upper deck of a Liverpool bus, where Harrison played "Raunchy" for Lennon. After McCartney's constant advocacy, Lennon allowed Harrison to join the Quarrymen as lead guitarist. Harrison's entry into the Quarrymen shifted the group even more away from skiffle, in addition to ending Lennon's use of banjo chords. Around this time, John Duff Lowe, another school friend of McCartney, joined the group on piano.

With Harrison's entry, the Quarrymen now had four guitarists. Lennon and McCartney suggested to Griffiths that he instead buy a bass guitar, but Griffiths refused because of the expense. The two subsequently convinced Nigel Walley, still acting as the group's manager, to fire Griffiths. Walley regretted the incident, and as a result gradually severed his ties with the Quarrymen. Around this same time, Len Garry contracted tubercular meningitis, and spent seven months in the hospital, never playing with the group again. This left Colin Hanton as the last of the group of Lennon's Quarry Bank classmates that originally comprised the group. In March, McCartney bought an Elpico amplifier with two inputs, and he and Harrison added pickups to their guitars, giving the Quarrymen an electric sound for the first time.

Percy Phillips operated a studio called Phillips' Sound Recording Services at 38 Kensington, Liverpool, between the kitchen and a front room that served as an electrical goods shop. Actors from the Liverpool Playhouse often stayed in the room above the studio, and were asked by Phillips to record monologues and poems. Phillips had just turned 60 years old when Harrison heard about the studio from guitarist Johnny Byrne of the Raving Texans, who had recorded a version of "Butterfly" there on 22 June 1957. The Quarrymen booked a recording session on 12 July 1958. They recorded straight to disc, as tape would have been an extra expense. The sound was recorded live by a single microphone in the centre of the room, and Lennon suggested that Hanton put a scarf over the snare drum to lower the volume. They first recorded a McCartney original (credited as McCartney/Harrison) followed by Buddy Holly's "That'll Be the Day". Both feature Lennon on lead vocals. When the recording was finished, Phillips handed the group a fragile 78rpm record, which was passed around the band for one week each, or lent out to friends. It was later lost until Lowe rediscovered it in 1981, and sold it to McCartney for an undisclosed amount. The recordings would later be issued on the Beatles' rarities album Anthology 1.

"The rhythm's in the guitars"

Soon after the recording session, Hanton had a fight with the rest of the group and quit. Lowe too lost contact with the group after leaving Liverpool Institute, leaving the Quarrymen as just a trio of guitarists: Lennon, McCartney, and Harrison. Lennon's mother was killed in a road accident on 15 July 1958, dealing him a devastating emotional blow. The group remained mostly inactive throughout the summer, as Lennon took up a job in a restaurant at the Liverpool Airport. McCartney and Harrison, meanwhile, went on holiday hitchhiking in Wales, playing with a local skiffle group called the Vikings. Although Lennon, McCartney, and Harrison remained extremely close, the trio only performed a handful of times in the last months of 1958. When asked why they had neither a drummer or a bass player, they would respond "The rhythm's in the guitars."

In the autumn of 1958, the group had another chance to audition for Carroll Levis, nearly a year and a half after the Quarrymen's first Star Search. For the audition, the group changed their name to Johnny and the Moondogs. Lennon was without a guitar, his having broken recently. Johnny and the Moondogs passed the first heat of the competition in Liverpool, and were invited to appear in the finals in Manchester. The group performed Buddy Holly's "Think It Over" to positive reception, but were unable to stay until the end of the competition to receive the results. As they were leaving, Lennon saw a cutaway electric guitar by the stage door, picked it up and walked off with it, later saying that the trip "wasn't a total loss."

Following their Star Search audition, Johnny and the Moondogs changed their name to Japage 3 (combining letters from each of the member's names: John, Paul, and George). Lennon had a friend from art school, named Derek Hodkin, who owned a tape recorder, and Lennon convinced him to record the group (along with McCartney's brother Mike on drums). The group then asked Hodkin to act as their manager, and he agreed. Despite Hodkin's management, bookings for the group dried up. Harrison began a stint as rhythm guitarist in the Les Stewart Quartet, who had a weekly club engagement. By May, Japage 3 was defunct, although the three continued to see each other socially, and Lennon and McCartney continued to write songs together.

The Casbah Club and name change to the Beatles

In the summer of 1959, Mona Best decided to open a club in her cellar, and offered the Les Stewart Quartet a residency if they would help convert the cellar. Harrison and fellow Quartet guitarist Ken Brown, however, missed a show, causing Les Stewart to fire the two and drop the residency. This caused distress to Best, but Harrison offered a solution: he recruited Lennon and McCartney to play, and they returned to calling themselves the Quarrymen. After helping Best finish converting the cellar, the new four guitarist line-up of the Quarrymen (Lennon, McCartney, Harrison, and Brown) opened the Casbah Coffee Club on 29 August 1959. The opening night performance was attended by about 300 local teenagers, but as the cellar had no air conditioning and people were dancing, the temperature rose until it became hard to breathe. The Quarrymen were afforded the use of Brown's three input amplifier (which, along with McCartney's Elpico, meant that all four guitarists were electric), and sang through one microphone connected to the club's small PA system.

The group continued their Casbah residency into the new year, occasionally securing other gigs. In January, Brown grew ill and was unable to play the show. Best, however, insisted that the Quarrymen still pay Brown, but Lennon, McCartney, and Harrison refused; the incident resulted in the loss of their residency at the Casbah and Brown's departure from the group. Shortly after, however, Lennon convinced fellow art school student Stuart Sutcliffe to purchase a bass guitar and join the group. The group had no bookings, but began rehearsing vigorously to allow the musical novice Sutcliffe practice on his new instrument.

In early 1960, the Quarrymen returned to Phillips' Sound Recording Services to record Lennon's new original song "One After 909", although this recording does not survive. Around the same time, the three made a rehearsal tape at McCartney's home. Harrison was absent (as he had an apprenticeship), and the tape features several jams and original songs, including the McCartney instrumental "Cayenne". With few gigs during this period the group often wrote letters to secure bookings, several of which survive. The four disliked the Quarrymen name, and went through several others during this period, including Los Paranoias. By March 1960, Lennon and Sutcliffe came up with a new name: the Beatles. The Beatles (after several line-up changes, including adding Mona's son Pete Best on drums) continued to perform around Liverpool and in Hamburg, Germany, before being signed to Parlophone Records in 1962.

Reformations: 1994 to present

Since the break-up of the Beatles in 1970 and the death of John Lennon in 1980, members of the Quarrymen have reunited several times. From 1994 to 1995, Rod Davis and John Lowe recorded an album with studio musicians. This album, Open for Engagements, was released in 1995 under the Quarrymen name.

The surviving members of the 1957 line-up of the Quarrymen reunited in 1997 for the 40th anniversary of their performance at the 1957 Woolton village fete, which was the location of the first meeting of Lennon and McCartney. All five surviving members from that day, Pete Shotton, Rod Davis, Len Garry, Eric Griffiths and Colin Hanton, performed. Following this, the group continued to perform, undertaking tours of the UK, the US, Germany, Japan, Russia, Cuba and other countries. The group's repertoire focuses on the skiffle and early rock and roll they played in their original incarnation with the added roots rock historical perspective of illustrating how American roots music inspired the nascent Beatles.

In 2000, producer and the Beatles' historian Martin Lewis produced the group performing the Del-Vikings song "Come Go with Me" (the first song McCartney recalled hearing Lennon sing on the first day they met) for use on the soundtrack of the Michael Lindsay-Hogg film Two of Us, a film about the last day that Lennon and McCartney saw each other in April 1976.

Eric Griffiths died in 2005, and Pete Shotton retired, owing to ill-health. Shotton died in 2017. As of 2016, Davis, Garry, and Hanton continue to perform around the world. Lowe occasionally performs with them. In September and October 2010, the band undertook a US tour celebrating the 70th birthday of their founder, Lennon. They appeared in a charity concert for Amnesty International honouring Lennon in New York City on Lennon's birthday, Saturday 9 October 2010. Since 2016, former Beatles bassist Chas Newby has been performing with the band.

Since their 1997 reformation, the Quarrymen have recorded three albums, consisting mostly of covers of 1950s rock and skiffle.

Members 
Current members
 Colin Hanton – drums (1956–59, 1997–present)
 Rod Davis – banjo (1957); guitar, vocals (1994–95, 1997–present)
 Len Garry – tea-chest bass (1957–58); vocals, guitar (1997–present)
 John Duff Lowe – piano (1958); keyboards (1994–95; since 2005, has been a regular guest, although not a constant member), vocals (1994–95)
 Chas Newby – bass guitar (2016–present; Newby also played bass with the Beatles briefly from 1960 to 1961)

Former members
 John Lennon – vocals, guitar (1956–60; died 1980)
 Eric Griffiths – guitar (1956–58, 1997–2005; died 2005)
 Pete Shotton – washboard (1956–57, 1997–2000; died 2017)
 Bill Smith – tea-chest bass (1956)
 Nigel Walley – tea-chest bass (1956; Subsequently, became "manager" 1956–58)
 Ivan Vaughan – tea-chest bass (1956–57; died 1993)
 Paul McCartney – vocals, guitar (1957–60)
 George Harrison – guitar, vocals (1958–60; died 2001)
 Ken Brown – guitar (1959–60; died 2010)
 Stuart Sutcliffe – bass guitar (1960; died 1962)

Timeline

Discography 
Studio albums
 Open for Engagements (1994) (Kewbank Records KBCD111) (John 'Duff' Lowe & Rod Davis)
 Get Back – Together (1997) (Q Records QMCD 7011) (Eric Griffiths, Len Garry, Rod Davis, Pete Shotton & Colin Hanton)
 Songs We Remember (2004) (BMG Augusta Records	AUCK15001) (Eric Griffiths, Len Garry, Rod Davis & Colin Hanton)
 Grey Album (2012) (Generate Records 885767482517) (Len Garry, Rod Davis & Colin Hanton)

Live albums
 Live At The Halfmoon Pub Putney (2005) (Colin Hanton, Len Garry, Rod Davis & John 'Duff' Lowe)
 The Quarrymen Live! In Penny Lane (2020) (Colin Hanton, Len Garry, Rod Davis & Chas Newby)

DVD
 The Band That Started The Beatles (2009) (Star-Club Records GRDVD091) (Len Garry, Rod Davis & Colin Hanton)

Other recordings
 "That'll Be the Day" and "In Spite of All the Danger" (both recorded in 1958) are available on the Beatles album Anthology 1 (1995).
 A number of home rehearsals featuring Lennon, McCartney, Harrison, and Sutcliffe were recorded in early 1960. Three of these were released on Anthology 1, while others have appeared on various bootlegs.
 A 2000 recording of "Come Go With Me" was featured in the film Two of Us.
 A Unreleased Recording of "Maggie Mae" being used in the film 'Looking for Lennon' (not to be  mistaken with the 2009 film "Nowhere Boy"

Notes

References

External links

 The Quarrymen official website
List of concerts 
Catherine E. Doyle: "From Blackjacks to Beatles: How the Fab Four Evolved"
The Quarrymen's First Recordings

1956 establishments in England
 

English country music groups
British rock and roll music groups
History of the Beatles
Musical groups from Liverpool
Musical groups established in 1956
Musical groups disestablished in 1960
Musical groups reestablished in 1997
Skiffle groups